The 2010–11 season was the 110th season of competitive association football and the 84th season in the Football League played by Tranmere Rovers Football Club, a professional football club based in Birkenhead, Wirral.

First-team squad
 Includes all players who were awarded squad numbers during the season.

Results

League One

FA Cup

League Cup

Football League Trophy

League table

References

Tranmere Rovers
Tranmere Rovers F.C. seasons